The 2016–17 Los Angeles Clippers season was the 47th season of the franchise in the National Basketball Association (NBA), their 39th season in Southern California, and their 33rd season in Los Angeles.

After 19 years, this was Paul Pierce's final season in the NBA, announcing his retirement after the season on September 26, 2016. He would retire as a Celtic on July 17, 2017, after signing a ceremonial contract with the Boston Celtics. On February 11, 2018, the Celtics retired Pierce's jersey. Pierce had played for the Celtics from 1998 to 2013 winning a championship in 2008 and was also the NBA Finals MVP.

The Clippers finished the regular season with a 51–31 record, securing the 4th seed. In the playoffs, they faced off against the Utah Jazz in the First Round, where they lost in seven games.

Following the season, Chris Paul was traded to the Houston Rockets for Patrick Beverley, Lou Williams, Sam Dekker, Montrezl Harrell, Darrun Hilliard, DeAndre Liggins, Kyle Wiltjer, a first round pick next year, and cash.

Draft

Roster

<noinclude>

Roster notes
 Forward Brandon Bass becomes the 26th former Laker to play for the crosstown rival Clippers.

Standings

By Division

By Conference

Game log

Pre-season

|- style="background:#fbb;"
| 1
| October 4
| @ Golden State
| 
| Marreese Speights (14)
| Blake Griffin (6)
| Jamal Crawford (4)
| Oracle Arena19,596
| 0–1
|- style="background:#bfb;"
| 2
| October 5
| Toronto
| 
| Blake Griffin (24)
| DeAndre Jordan (10)
| Chris Paul (15)
| Staples Center13,957
| 1–1
|- style="background:#fbb;"
| 3
| October 10
| Utah
| 
| Jamal Crawford (16)
| DeAndre Jordan (6)
| Chris Paul (5)
| Staples Center12,518
| 1–2
|- style="background:#bfb;"
| 4
| October 13
| Portland
| 
| Blake Griffin (26)
| DeAndre Jordan (9)
| Chris Paul (10)
| Staples Center14,896
| 2–2
|- style="background:#fbb;"
| 5
| October 17
| @ Utah
| 
| Austin Rivers (15)
| Brandon Bass (10)
| Austin Rivers (4)
| Vivint Smart Home Arena18,811
| 2–3
|- style="background:#bfb;"
| 6
| October 18
| @ Sacramento
| 
| JJ Redick (18)
| DeAndre Jordan (7)
| Chris Paul (8)
| Golden 1 Center16,000
| 3–3

Regular season

|- style="background:#cfc;"
| 1
| October 27
| @ Portland
| 
| Paul, Griffin (27)
| Blake Griffin (13)
| Chris Paul (5)
| Moda Center19,500
| 1–0
|- style="background:#cfc;"
| 2
| October 30
| Utah
| 
| Austin Rivers (19)
| DeAndre Jordan (16)
| Chris Paul (9)
| Staples Center19,060
| 2–0
|- style="background:#cfc;"
| 3
| October 31
| Phoenix
| 
| Chris Paul (24)
| Jordan, Griffin (11)
| Chris Paul (8)
| Staples Center19,060
| 3–0

|- style="background:#fcc;"
| 4
| November 2
| Oklahoma City 
|  
| Chris Paul (15)
| Chris Paul (11)
| Chris Paul (9)
| Staples Center 19,060
| 3–1
|- style="background:#cfc;"
| 5
| November 4
| @ Memphis
| 
| Chris Paul (27)
| DeAndre Jordan (21)
| Chris Paul (11)
| FedExForum19,060
| 4–1
|- style="background:#cfc;"
| 6
| November 5
| @ San Antonio
| 
| Blake Griffin (28)
| Jordan, Paul, Speights (8)
| Chris Paul (10)
| AT&T Center18,418
| 5–1
|- style="background:#cfc;"
| 7
| November 7
| Detroit 
|  
| Chris Paul (24)
| Jordan, Griffin (10)
| Blake Griffin (9)
| Staples Center 19,060
| 6–1
|- style="background:#cfc"
| 8
| November 9
| Portland 
| 
| Blake Griffin (22)
| Blake Griffin (13)
| Chris Paul (7)
| Staples Center19,060
| 7–1
|- style="background:#cfc"
| 9
| November 11
| @ Oklahoma City 
| 
| Blake Griffin (25)
| DeAndre Jordan (13)
| Chris Paul (10)
| Chesapeake Energy Arena18,203
| 8–1
|- style="background:#cfc"
| 10
| November 12
| @ Minnesota 
| 
| Blake Griffin (20)
| DeAndre Jordan (16)
| Chris Paul (8)
| Target Center14,494
| 9–1
|- style="background:#cfc"
| 11
| November 14
| Brooklyn 
| 
| Chris Paul (21)
| DeAndre Jordan (14)
| Chris Paul (9)
| Staples Center19,060
| 10–1
|- style="background:#fcc"
| 12
| November 16
| Memphis 
| 
| JJ Redick (29)
| DeAndre Jordan (14)
| Chris Paul (6)
| Staples Center19,060
| 10–2
|- style="background:#cfc"
| 13
| November 18
| @ Sacramento 
| 
| JJ Redick (26)
| DeAndre Jordan (12)
| Chris Paul (12)
| Golden 1 Center17,608
| 11–2
|- style="background:#cfc"
| 14
| November 19
| Chicago 
| 
| Blake Griffin (26)
| Blake Griffin (13)
| Chris Paul (8)
| Staples Center19,060
| 12–2
|- style="background:#cfc"
| 15
| November 21
| Toronto 
| 
| Paul, Griffin (26)
| DeAndre Jordan (15)
| Chris Paul (12)
| Staples Center19,060
| 13–2
|- style="background:#cfc"
| 16
| November 23
| @ Dallas 
| 
| Austin Rivers (22)
| Marreese Speights (12)
| Blake Griffin (7)
| American Airlines Center20,042
| 14–2
|- style="background:#fcc"
| 17
| November 25
| @ Detroit 
| 
| Redick, Griffin (24)
| DeAndre Jordan (9)
| Chris Paul (15)
| Palace of Auburn Hills17,023
| 14–3
|- style="background:#fcc"
| 18
| November 27
| @ Indiana 
| 
| Blake Griffin (16)
| DeAndre Jordan (14)
| Chris Paul (4)
| Bankers Life Fieldhouse15,572
| 14–4
|- style="background:#fcc"
| 19
| November 29
| @ Brooklyn 
| 
| Chris Paul (26)
| DeAndre Jordan (20)
| Chris Paul (13)
| Barclays Center15,681
| 14–5

|- style= "background:#cfc;"
| 20
| December 1
| @ Cleveland
| 
| JJ Redick (23)
| DeAndre Jordan (15)
| Blake Griffin (11)
| Quicken Loans Arena 20,562
| 15–5
|- style= "background:#cfc;"
| 21
| December 2
| @ New Orleans
| 
| Blake Griffin (27)
| DeAndre Jordan (13)
| Chris Paul (13)
| Smoothie King Center 20,562
| 16–5
|- style="background:#fcc"
| 22
| December 4
| Indiana 
| 
| Blake Griffin (24)
| Blake Griffin (16)
| Chris Paul (11)
| Staples Center19,060
| 16–6
|- style="background:#fcc;
| 23
| December 7
| Golden State
| 
| Jamal Crawford (21)
| DeAndre Jordan (12)
| Chris Paul (5)
| Staples Center19,239
| 16−7
|- style="background:#cfc;
| 24
| December 10
| New Orleans
| 
| Chris Paul (20)
| Marreese Speights (12)
| Chris Paul (20)
| Staples Center19,060
| 17−7
|- style="background:#cfc;"
| 25
| December 12
| Portland
| 
| Blake Griffin (26)
| Jordan, Griffin (12)
| Chris Paul (14)
| Staples Center19,060
| 18–7
|- style="background:#cfc;"
| 26
| December 14
| @ Orlando
| 
| Austin Rivers (25)
| DeAndre Jordan (12)
| Chris Paul (10)
| Amway Center18,846
| 19–7
|- style="background:#cfc;"
| 27
| December 16
| @ Miami
| 
| Blake Griffin (20)
| DeAndre Jordan (19)
| Chris Paul (6)
| American Airlines Arena19,600
| 20–7
|- style="background:#fcc;"
| 28
| December 18
| @ Washington
| 
| Blake Griffin (26)
| DeAndre Jordan (17)
| Chris Paul (12)
| Verizon Center17,380
| 20–8
|- style="background:#cfc;"
| 29
| December 20
| Denver
| 
| JJ Redick (27)
| DeAndre Jordan (13)
| Chris Paul (15)
| Staples Center19,060
| 21–8
|- style="background:#cfc;"
| 30
| December 22
| San Antonio
|  
| Chris Paul (19)
| DeAndre Jordan (9)
| Chris Paul (6)
| Staples Center19,060
| 22–8
|- style="background:#fcc;"
| 31
| December 23
| Dallas
|  
| Jamal Crawford (26)
| DeAndre Jordan (17)
| Jamal Crawford (6)
| Staples Center19,060
| 22–9
|- style="background:#fcc;"
| 32
| December 25
| @ L.A. Lakers
|  
| Crawford, Redick (22)
| Felton, Jordan (10)
| Felton, Jordan (6)
| Staples Center18,997
| 22–10
|- style="background:#fcc;"
| 33
| December 26
| Denver
| 
| Jamal Crawford (24)
| DeAndre Jordan (11)
| Jamal Crawford (6)
| Staples Center19,060
| 22–11
|- style="background:#fcc;"
| 34
| December 28
| @ New Orleans
| 
| Austin Rivers (22)
| DeAndre Jordan (25)
| Chris Paul (6)
| Smoothie King Center16,647
| 22–12
|- style="background:#fcc;"
| 35
| December 30
| @ Houston
| 
| Raymond Felton (26)
| DeAndre Jordan (13)
| Raymond Felton (8)
| Toyota Center18,055
| 22–13
|- style="background:#fcc;"
| 36
| December 31
| @ Oklahoma City
| 
| Bass, Speights (18)
| DeAndre Jordan (11)
| Jamal Crawford (5)
| Chesapeake Energy Arena18,203
| 22–14
|- style="background:#;"

|- style="background:#cfc;"
| 37 
| January 2
| Phoenix
| 
| JJ Redick (22)
| DeAndre Jordan (20)
| Crawford, Felton, Rivers (5) 
| Staples Center 19,060
| 23–14
|- style="background:#cfc;"
| 38 
| January 4
| Memphis
| 
| Austin Rivers (28)
| DeAndre Jordan (20)
| Austin Rivers (7)
| Staples Center19,060
| 24-14
|- style="background:#cfc;"
| 39
| January 6
| @ Sacramento
| 
| Austin Rivers (24)
| Marreese Speights (11)
| Chris Paul (12)
| Golden 1 Center17,608
| 25–14
|- style="background:#cfc;"
| 40
| January 8
| Miami
| 
| JJ Redick (25)
| DeAndre Jordan (18)
| Chris Paul (18)
| Staples Center19,060
| 26–14
|- style="background:#cfc;"
| 41
| January 11
| Orlando
| 
| JJ Redick (22)
| DeAndre Jordan (20)
| Chris Paul (6)
| Staples Center19,060
| 27–14
|- style="background:#cfc;"
| 42
| January 14
| L. A. Lakers
| 
| DeAndre Jordan (24)
| DeAndre Jordan (21)
| Chris Paul (13)
| Staples Center19,060
| 28–14
|- style="background:#cfc;"
| 43
| January 16
| Oklahoma City
| 
| Marreese Speights (23)
| DeAndre Jordan (15)
| Felton, Paul, Rivers (6)
| Staples Center19,060
| 29–14
|- style="background:#fcc;"
| 44
| January 19
| Minnesota
| 
| DeAndre Jordan (29)
| DeAndre Jordan (16)
| Raymond Felton (8)
| Staples Center19,060
| 29–15
|- style=background:#fcc;"
| 45
| January 21
| @ Denver
| 
| Marreese Speights (18)
| DeAndre Jordan (13)
| Jamal Crawford (7)
| Pepsi Center16,543
| 29–16
|- style="background:#cfc;"
| 46
| January 23
| @ Atlanta
| 
| Austin Rivers (27)
| DeAndre Jordan (12)
| Austin Rivers (6)
| Philips Arena15,866
| 30-16
|- style="background:#fcc;"
| 47
| January 24
| @ Philadelphia
| 
| Jamal Crawford (27)
| DeAndre Jordan (20)
| Blake Griffin (6)
| Wells Fargo Center16,741
| 30-17
|- style="background:#fcc;"
| 48
| January 28
| @ Golden State
| 
| Blake Griffin (20)
| Raymond Felton (7)
| Austin Rivers (6)
| Oracle Arena19,596
| 30–18

|- style="background:#cfc;"
| 49
| February 1
| @ Phoenix
| 
| Blake Griffin (29)
| DeAndre Jordan (12)
| Crawford, Griffin (5)
| Talking Stick Resort Arena16,191
| 31–18
|- style="background:#fcc;"
| 50
| February 2
| Golden State
| 
| Blake Griffin (31)
| Blake Griffin (8)
| Austin Rivers (6)
| Staples Center19,060
| 31−19
|- style=background:#fcc;"
| 51
| February 5
| @ Boston
| 
| Crawford, Griffin (23)
| DeAndre Jordan (16)
| Crawford, Rivers (6)
| TD Garden18,624
| 31–20
|- style=background:#fcc;"
| 52
| February 6
| @ Toronto
| 
| Blake Griffin (26)
| Blake Griffin (11)
| Blake Griffin (11)
| Air Canada Centre19,800
| 31–21
|- style=background:#cfc;"
|53
|February 8
| @ New York
|
|Blake Griffin (32)
|DeAndre Jordan (15)
|Austin Rivers (10)
|Madison Square Garden 17,445
| 32–21
|- style=background:#cfc;"
|54
|February 11
| @ Charlotte
|
|Jamal Crawford (22)
|DeAndre Jordan (16)
|Blake Griffin (8)
|Spectrum Center16,567
| 33–21
|- style=background:#cfc;"
|55
|February 13
|@ Utah
|
|Blake Griffin (26)
|DeAndre Jordan (13)
|Blake Griffin (6)
| Vivint Smart Home Arena19,521
| 34–21
|- style=background:#cfc;"
|56
|February 15
|Atlanta
|
|Blake Griffin (17)
|DeAndre Jordan (16)
|Blake Griffin (9)
|Staples Center19,060
| 35–21
|- style=background:#fcc;"
|57
|February 23
| @ Golden State
| 
|Crawford, Rivers (19)
|DeAndre Jordan (11)
|Blake Griffin (8)
| Oracle Arena18,654
| 35-22
|- style=background:#fcc;"
|58
|February 24
| San Antonio
| 
|Blake Griffin (29)
|Blake Griffin (9)
|Griffin, Paul (5)
| Staples Center19,060
| 35–23
|- style=background:#cfc;"
|59
| February 26
| Charlotte
|
|Blake Griffin (43)
|DeAndre Jordan (19)
|Chris Paul (17)
| Staples Center19,060
| 36–23

|- style="background:#fcc;"
| 60
| March 1
| Houston
| 
|Blake Griffin (17)
|DeAndre Jordan (9)
|Chris Paul (11)
| Staples Center19,060
| 36–24
|- style=background:#fcc;"
| 61
| March 3
| @ Milwaukee
| 
|Griffin, Paul (21)
|DeAndre Jordan (10)
|Blake Griffin (8)
| BMO Harris Bradley Center16,208
| 36–25
|- style="background:#cfc;"
| 62
| March 4
| @ Chicago
| 
|Jamal Crawford (25)
|DeAndre Jordan (11)
|Blake Griffin (7)
| United Center15,555
| 37–25
|- style=background:#cfc;"
| 63
| March 6
| Boston
| 
|Blake Griffin (26)
|DeAndre Jordan (12)
|Crawford, Felton (5)
| Staples Center19,283
| 38–25
|- style=background:#fcc;"
| 64
| March 8
| @ Minnesota
| 
|DeAndre Jordan (20)
|DeAndre Jordan (10)
|Chris Paul (13)
| Target Center15,653
| 38–26
|- style=background:#cfc;"
| 65
| March 9
| @ Memphis
| 
|Austin Rivers (20)
|Blake Griffin (12)
|Blake Griffin (8)
| FedEx Forum16,721
| 39–26
|- style=background:#cfc;"
| 66
| March 11
| Philadelphia
| 
|Chris Paul (30)
|DeAndre Jordan (20)
|Chris Paul (7)
| Staples Center19,060
| 40–26
|- style=background:#fcc;"
| 67
| March 13
| @ Utah
| 
|Chris Paul (33)
|Blake Griffin (9)
|Chris Paul (7)
|Vivint Smart Home Arena18,428
|40–27
|- style=background:#fcc;"
|68
|March 15
| Milwaukee
|
|DeAndre Jordan (22)
|DeAndre Jordan (17)
|Chris Paul (7)
|Staples Center19,060
|40–28
|- style=background:#fcc;"
|69
|March 16
|@ Denver
|
|JJ Redick (22)
|Luc Mbah a Moute (6)
|Chris Paul (14)
|Pepsi Center16,527
|40–29
|- style=background:#cfc;"
|70
|March 18
|Cleveland
|
|Blake Griffin (23)
|DeAndre Jordan (17)
|Chris Paul (7)
|Staples Center19,060
|41–29
|- style=background:#cfc;"
|71
|March 20
|New York
|
|Blake Griffin (30)
|DeAndre Jordan (10)
|Chris Paul (13)
|Staples Center19,060
|42–29
|- style=background:#cfc;"
|72
|March 21
|@ L. A. Lakers
|
|Chris Paul (27)
|DeAndre Jordan (11)
|Blake Griffin (8)
|Staples Center18,724
|43–29
|- style=background:#fcc;"
|73
|March 23
|@ Dallas
|
|Blake Griffin (24)
|DeAndre Jordan (18)
|Chris Paul (6)
|American Airlines Arena19,703
|43–30
|- style=background:#cfc;"
|74
|March 25
|Utah
|
|Jamal Crawford (28)
|DeAndre Jordan (15)
|Chris Paul (5)
|Staples Center19,060
|44–30
|- style=background:#fcc;"
|75
|March 26
|Sacramento
|
|DeAndre Jordan (20)
|DeAndre Jordan (11)
|Chris Paul (9)
|Staples Center19,060
|44–31
|- style=background:#cfc;"
|76
|March 29
|Washington
|
|JJ Redick (31)
|DeAndre Jordan (18)
|Chris Paul (13)
|Staples Center19,060
|45–31
|- style=background:#cfc;"
|77
|March 30
|@ Phoenix
|
|Blake Griffin (31)
|DeAndre Jordan (17)
|Chris Paul (10)
|Talking Stick Resort Arena16,602
|46–31

|- style=background:#cfc;"
|78
|April 1
|L. A. Lakers
|
|Blake Griffin (36)
|DeAndre Jordan (12)
|Chris Paul (12)
|Staples Center19,060
|47–31
|- style=background:#cfc;"
|79
|April 5
|Dallas
|
|Blake Griffin (32)
|DeAndre Jordan (20)
|Chris Paul (11)
|Staples Center19,060
|48–31
|-style=background:#cfc;"
|80
|April 8
|@ San Antonio
|
|Chris Paul (19)
|DeAndre Jordan (16)
|Chris Paul (8)
|AT&T Center18,418
|49–31
|- style=background:#cfc;"
|81
|April 10
|Houston
|
|Crawford, Paul (19)
|DeAndre Jordan (11)
|Chris Paul (9)
|Staples Center19,163
|50–31
|- style=background:#cfc;"
|82
|April 12
|Sacramento
|
|Jordan, Redick (18)
|DeAndre Jordan (17)
|Chris Paul (9)
|Staples Center19,060
|51–31

Playoffs

|- style="background:#fcc;"
| 1
| April 15
| Utah
| 
| Blake Griffin (26)
| DeAndre Jordan (15)
| Chris Paul (11)
| Staples Center19,060
| 0–1
|- style="background:#cfc;"
| 2
| April 18
| Utah
| 
| Blake Griffin (24)
| DeAndre Jordan (15)
| Chris Paul (10)
| Staples Center 19,060
| 1–1
|- style="background:#cfc;"
| 3
| April 21
| @ Utah
| 
| Chris Paul (34)
| DeAndre Jordan (13)
| Chris Paul (10)
| Vivint Smart Home Arena18,865
| 2–1
|- style="background:#fcc;"
| 4
| April 23
| @ Utah
| 
| Chris Paul (27)
| DeAndre Jordan (10)
| Chris Paul (12)
| Vivint Smart Home Arena19,911
| 2–2
|- style="background:#fcc;"
| 5
| April 25
| Utah
| 
| Chris Paul (28)
| DeAndre Jordan (12)
| Chris Paul (9)
| Staples Center19,060
| 2–3
|- style="background:#cfc;"
| 6
| April 28
| @ Utah
| 
| Chris Paul (29)
| DeAndre Jordan (18)
| Chris Paul (8)
| Vivint Smart Home Arena19,121
| 3–3
|- style="background:#fcc;"
| 7
| April 30
| Utah
| 
| DeAndre Jordan (24)
| DeAndre Jordan (17)
| Chris Paul (9)
| Staples Center19,060
| 3–4

Transactions

Trades

Free agents

Re-signed

Additions

Subtractions

References

Los Angeles Clippers seasons
Los Angeles Clippers
Los Angeles Clippers
Los Angeles Clippers
Los Angeles Clippers
Los Angeles Clippers